The Festival du Vent is an annual arts festival taking place since 1992 in Calvi, Haute-Corse, a town of Corsica, in France.

The Festival du Vent takes place since 1992 between October and November. It is regarded as one of the main festivals of Calvi. Every year more than six hundred people work to prepare the features of festival. The festival includes music concerts of all genres, theatre and art exhibitions, paragliding, windsurfing and sailing.

Sources

External links 
Official website of the festival

Music festivals in France